Paradelphomyia americana is a crane fly in the family Limoniidae found in Central and South America. It was previously included in the genus Toxorhina but has been reclassified.

References

Limoniidae
Insects described in 1913